The Raba is a river in the south of Poland (Lesser Poland Voivodeship), right tributary to the river Vistula. Its source is in the Beskids, between the towns of Rabka-Zdrój and Nowy Targ. It flows to the north and then to the northeast. Towns along the river Raba include Rabka-Zdrój, Mszana Dolna, Myślenice, Dobczyce and Bochnia.

For centuries, the Raba was an important artery, along which several towns and villages were established. Its name probably comes from Celtic languages, and the Raba is divided into three parts: the Upper Raba ( long located in the Beskids), the Middle Raba (in the Carpathian Foothills), and the Lower Raba (in the Sandomierz Basin).

From its source downstream to the town of Myślenice, the Raba is a typical mountain river, with narrow valley, rock-covered bed, fast currents and big drops. Below Lake Dobczyce it retains its mountain features for several kilometers. The river has no tributaries for its last .

The Raba marks the boundary between the Makow Beskids and the Island Beskids, as well as the boundary between the Wieliczka Foothills, and the Wisnicz Foothills. Its tributaries are mainly mountain streams, such as Poniczanka, Slonka, Krzyworzeka, Mszanka, Kasinianka, Kaczanka, Krzczonówka, Trzemesnianka, Stradomka, Babica.

See also 
 Rivers of Poland
 1934 flood in Poland

Sources 
 Description of the Raba

External links 
 Fishing on the Raba
 Kayaking on the Raba

Rivers of Poland
Rivers of Lesser Poland Voivodeship